Klein Borstel is a station on the Hamburg U-Bahn line U1. It was opened in May 1925 and is located in Hamburg, Germany, in the suburb of Klein Borstel in the quarter of Ohlsdorf. Ohlsdorf is part of the borough of Hamburg-Nord.

History 
The station was opened in May 1925, it was the last to open on the Langenhorn railway. The station is one of the less frequented stations of the Hamburg U-Bahn. It was fully renovated in 1955. In 1939 and in 1974 the platform was extended to allow the stop of longer trains.

The track of the freight railway from Ohlsdorf to Ochsenzoll was located east of the U-Bahn tracks. It was used until 1991 and removed in 2008.

Station layout
The station is an elevated station with an island platform and two tracks. The station is not accessible for handicapped persons without help, as there is no lift.

Service

Trains
Klein Borstel is served by Hamburg U-Bahn line U1; departures are every 5 minutes, every 10 minutes in non-busy periods.

See also

 List of Hamburg U-Bahn stations

References

External links 

 Line and route network plans at hvv.de 

Hamburg U-Bahn stations in Hamburg
U1 (Hamburg U-Bahn) stations
Buildings and structures in Hamburg-Nord
Railway stations in Germany opened in 1925